The Messiah is the third novel in a trilogy by Marjorie Holmes based on the life of Jesus Christ.  The story continues where Three from Galilee left off, with Jesus ready to begin his earthly ministry as the Messiah.  The book was published in 1987.

The trilogy was highly popular.

References

American Christian novels
Novelistic portrayals of Jesus
1987 American novels